Faruk Gül (born 15 August 1988) is a German former professional football who played as a midfielder.

References

External links
 
 
 

Living people
1988 births
German people of Turkish descent
Turkish footballers
German footballers
Association football midfielders
3. Liga players
Swiss Challenge League players
Swiss Promotion League players
VfL Bochum II players
1. FC Heidenheim players
FC Schaffhausen players
SC Pfullendorf players
German expatriate footballers
German expatriate sportspeople in Switzerland
Expatriate footballers in Switzerland
People from Steinfurt
Sportspeople from Münster (region)
Footballers from North Rhine-Westphalia